Jean-Luc du Plessis (born 7 May 1994 in Cape Town) is a South African rugby union player for the  in Super Rugby and for  in the Currie Cup and the Rugby Challenge. His regular position is fly-half.

Career

Youth

He represented  at youth level, represented them at the 2007 Under-13 Craven Week competition and at the 2012 Under-18 Craven Week competition. However, at the end of 2012, despite being offered a spot in the Western Province Rugby Institute and receiving a contract with Western Province, he moved to Durban instead to join the  Academy.

In April 2014, Du Plessis was named in the South Africa Under-20 squad for the 2014 IRB Junior World Championship.

Sharks

Du Plessis' first class debut came for the  during the 2014 Vodacom Cup competition. Within five minutes of coming on, Du Plessis scored a try and kicked the subsequent conversion.

Western Province

He returned to Cape Town in 2015, joining  for the 2015 Vodacom Cup competition.

Personal

Du Plessis is the son of former Springbok player and head coach, Carel du Plessis. Two of his uncles, Michael du Plessis and Willie du Plessis, are former Springboks. His cousin Daniël du Plessis is also a rugby player that represented the South Africa Under-20 team in 2015. He went to Kenridge Primary School and to Paarl Boys' High School

References

South African rugby union players
Living people
1994 births
Rugby union players from Cape Town
Sharks (Currie Cup) players
Stormers players
South Africa Under-20 international rugby union players
Western Province (rugby union) players
Mie Honda Heat players
Tokyo Sungoliath players
Rugby union fly-halves